Heteropsis narcissus is a butterfly in the family Nymphalidae. It is found on Madagascar, Mauritius, Réunion and the Comoros. The habitat consists of forest margins, orchids, unnatural grasslands and anthropogenic environments.

The larvae feed on Poaceae species, including Bambusa species.

Subspecies
Heteropsis narcissus narcissus (Mauritius, Reunion)
Heteropsis narcissus fraterna (Butler, 1868) (Madagascar, Anjouan)
Heteropsis narcissus borbonica (Oberthür, 1916) (Reunion)
Heteropsis narcissus comorensis (Oberthür, 1916) (Anjouan and Moheli)
Heteropsis narcissus salimi (Turlin, 1994) (Grand Comore)
Heteropsis narcissus mayottensis (Oberthür, 1916) (Comoro Islands)

References

Elymniini
Taxa named by Johan Christian Fabricius
Butterflies described in 1798
Lepidoptera of the Comoros
Lepidoptera of Madagascar
Insects of Mauritius
Lepidoptera of Réunion
Fauna of Mayotte